Frank Pike (3 June 1925 – 11 November 2011) was an  Australian rules footballer who played with Geelong in the Victorian Football League (VFL).

Notes

External links 

1925 births
2011 deaths
Australian rules footballers from Victoria (Australia)
Geelong Football Club players